Ektov is a Russian masculine surname, its feminine counterpart is Ektova. It may refer to:

Aleksandr Ektov
Irina Ektova (born 1987), Kazakhstani triple jumper
Yevgeniy Ektov (born 1986), Kazakhstani triple jumper, husband of Irina

Russian-language surnames